Shahbaz Ahmed (born 12 December 1994) is an Indian international cricketer who plays for the Indian cricket team. He made his international debut on 9 October, 2022. He plays for Royal Challengers Bangalore in the Indian Premier League and Bengal in domestic cricket. He is a bowling all-rounder who bats left-handed.

In August 2022, Shahbaz was named as a replacement for injured Washington Sundar in India's ODI squad for their tour against Zimbabwe. In October 2022, he was named in India's ODI squad, for their series against South Africa. He made his ODI debut on 9 October 2022 against South Africa.

Domestic career
Shahbaz made his List A debut for Bengal in the 2018–19 Vijay Hazare Trophy on 20 September 2018 against Jammu and Kashmir team  at Chennai. He returned with figures of 1/22 in his debut match. During his maiden first-class cap versus Hyderabad, he scored 27 runs and picked one wicket. He made his Twenty20 debut for Bengal in the 2018–19 Syed Mushtaq Ali Trophy on 24 February 2019 against Haryana at Cuttack and picked one wicket again besides contributing a vital 12-ball 17 in the lower order that eventually helped his team win the match by three wickets.

So far, Shahbaz has played 13 first-class matches, scoring 559 runs, including four half-centuries, taking 37 first-class wickets at an economy rate of 2.60. In List-A cricket, he has scored 435 runs in 16 innings at an average of 39.54. He has 18 List-A wickets to his name, with his best figures of 3/35. In T20 cricket, he has taken 21 wickets in 23 innings at an economy rate of 6.84 and has recorded one fifty.

In January 2021, against Hyderabad, he became the seventh player from Bengal and first since India pacer Mohammed Shami to claim a Ranji Trophy hat-trick.

In October 2019, he was named in India A's squad for the 2019–20 Deodhar Trophy.

Indian Premier League
In the 2020 IPL auction, he was bought by the Royal Challengers Bangalore ahead of the 2020 Indian Premier League.

He made his debut in the IPL against Rajasthan Royals, during the 33rd match of 2020 Indian Premier League. Shahbaz went wicketless and conceded 18 runs. Throughout the season, he took a couple of wickets in as many games he played with an economy rate of 7.33. In April 2021, Shahbaz took three wickets in one over against the Sunrisers Hyderabad during the sixth match of 2021 Indian Premier League, which was eventually won by his team. His performances earned praise from a section of critics. During the second phase of the tournament, against Rajasthan he took a brace for 10 runs.

In February 2022, he was bought by the Royal Challengers Bangalore in the auction for the 2022 Indian Premier League tournament.

References

External links
 

1994 births
Living people
Indian cricketers
India One Day International cricketers
Bengal cricketers
Royal Challengers Bangalore cricketers